Chedly Ayari (8 August 1933 – 28 January 2021) was a Tunisian politician, economist, and diplomat. He served in several ministerial positions under the government of Habib Bourguiba and was President of the Central Bank of Tunisia from 24 July 2012 to 16 February 2018.

Early life and education
Ayari was born in Tunis. After his secondary studies at Sadiki College, he enrolled in the School for Advanced Studies in the Social Sciences. He earned a doctorate in economics in 1961 and a master's degree in private law from the School for Advanced Studies in the Social Sciences of the Paris-Sorbonne University.

Career 
Ayari began his career as a department head at the Société Tunisienne de Banque before becoming an assistant professor at Tunis University the following year. He earned an agrégation in economics from the University of Paris and became a professor at Tunis University and at the Faculté de droit et des sciences économiques et de gestion de Tunis, as well as an assistant professor at Aix-Marseille University and the University of Nice Sophia Antipolis.

As a researcher, Ayari studied international financial and monetary relations, macroeconomic policy, and human development. He was involved in several international research institutions, such as the Economic Research Forum in Cairo. He was also vice-president of the Tunisian National Advisory Council for Scientific Research and Technology. He was the author of numerous books focusing on economic, financial, monetary, social, and political issues, which were published in French, Arabic, English, and German.

He was then a member of the political office and central committee of the Socialist Destourian Party until 1975. President Habib Bourguiba appointed him to numerous ministerial positions within his cabinet. He served as Minister of Equipment, Housing and Spatial Planning from 7 November 1969 to 12 June 1970 and again from 25 September 1974 to 19 February 1975. He was Minister of Finance from 22 March 1972 to 25 September 1974. On 22 January 2010, he was appointed by decree to the Chamber of Advisors.

Ayari held several diplomatic responsibilities, such as economic advisor to the Tunisian delegation at the United Nations in New York City from 1960 to 1964. He was also Ambassador to the European Commission, Belgium, and Luxembourg in 1972. He was Chairman of the Commission for Industrial Development at the UN in 1962 and of the Arab Bank for Economic Development in Africa from 1963 to 1964, executive director of the World Bank from 1964 to 1965, and a member of the advisory board for the African Development Bank.

Ayari was appointed president of the Central Bank of Tunisia on 24 July 2012, replacing Mustapha Kamel Nabli and being approved by the Constituent Assembly of Tunisia by a vote of 97 to 89, with 4 abstentions. His approval was highly criticized due to his relationship with former ruler Zine El Abidine Ben Ali, who was overthrown during the Tunisian Revolution in 2011. As President of the Bank, he sought to improve the Tunisian economic situation, while bringing reforms to banking and financial systems within the country. Thanks to his efforts, he won the Tatweej Award for Excellence and Quality in the Arab world in 2014. In 2017, he earned a grade of B from the Central Banker Report Cards, awarded by the American magazine Global Finance. On 14 February 2018, he assured the Assembly of the Representatives of the People in a hearing that Tunisia's placement on the blacklist of the European Parliament was purely political. That same day, he submitted his resignation as President of the Central Bank of Tunisia to Prime Minister Youssef Chahed. His successor, was appointed on 19 February 2018.

Personal life 
He was the son of Sadok and Fatouma Ayari. He married Élaine Vatteau in 1959, and the couple lived in Gammarth, where their three children were born.

He died of COVID-19 during the COVID-19 pandemic in Tunisia.

Honours
Grand Cordon of the Order of Tunisian Independence
Grand Cordon of the Order of the Tunisian Republic
Grand Officer of the Ordre du 7-Novembre
Grand Officer of the Legion of Honour

Publications
Analyse de la structure économique : les fonctions de structure économique (1968)
La coopération inter-universitaire dans la promotion du développement (1969)
Mécanismes et institutions de la coopération arabo-africaine : le rôle de la BADEA (1975)
De nouvelles perspectives pour la coopération arabo-africaine (1981)
Arab-African co-operation: facing the challenge of the '80s (1985)
Ten Years of Afro-Arab Cooperation, 1975-1984 (1985)
La Guerre du Golfe et l'avenir des Arabes : débat et réflexions (1991)
Enjeux méditerranéens : pour une coopération euro-arabe (1992)
La Méditerranée économique. Premier rapport général sur la situation des riverains au début des années 1990 (1992)
Mélanges en l'honneur de Habib Ayadi (2000)
La souveraineté nationale face à la mondialisation : conflit non résolu (2002)
Le système de développement tunisien : vue rétrospective. Les années 1962-1986. Analyse institutionnelle (2003)
Variables internationales et nouveaux rôles régionaux (2005)

References

1933 births
2021 deaths
Tunisian politicians
Tunisian economists
Alumni of Sadiki College
Paris-Sorbonne University alumni
Governors of the Central Bank of Tunisia
Socialist Destourian Party politicians
Academic staff of Tunis University
Academic staff of Côte d'Azur University
Members of the Tunisian Academy of Sciences, Letters, and Arts
Grand Officiers of the Légion d'honneur
Deaths from the COVID-19 pandemic in Tunisia
Academic staff of Aix-Marseille University